The Marshall Arena (formerly known as Arena MK, also Milton Keynes Arena) is a multi-purpose arena in Milton Keynes, Buckinghamshire, England, located beside Stadium MK. The  multi-use event space is positioned over three floors and anticipates music and sporting events, conferences, exhibitions and parties.

History
The arena was to be the home of the Milton Keynes Lions professional basketball team.  However, the retail developments that would have provided enabling funding were deferred due to lack of financing, leaving the Lions without a home. Following the conclusion of the 2011–12 season, the Lions could not secure a venue within Milton Keynes, resulting in a move south to the Copper Box.

It officially opened on 8 February 2014 when it hosted the 2014 English National Badminton Championships.

Name
In September 2018, Marshall Amplification announced an agreement with Arena MK to use the space for music events, rebranding it the "Marshall Arena".

Regular tournaments

Darts
The Arena has hosted the Professional Darts Corporation's Masters tournament since 2015.

Snooker
Marshall Arena was chosen as the venue for the 2020 Championship League snooker tournament taking place in June 2020 because of the convenience of its on-site facilities. During the UK's coronavirus lockdown, it was important that the event was able take place behind closed doors with no need for players and officials to leave the venue for the duration of their involvement once they have arrived. For similar reasons, the Arena hosted the first 13 tournaments of the 2020–21 snooker season as well as the qualifiers for the 2021 German Masters.

As a direct result of the venues’ ability to keep the snooker tour running during a pandemic, it was selected to be the venue of the 2021 English Open and also became the backup venue for the 2022 European Masters. The 2022 British Open would also be selected as the venue for the event.

References

External links
Official website

Indoor arenas in England
Basketball venues in England
Buildings and structures in Milton Keynes
Sport in Milton Keynes
London Lions (basketball)
Darts venues
Sports venues completed in 2014
2014 establishments in England
Snooker venues